Roman Kokoshko (born 16 August 1996) is a Ukrainian track and field athlete who competes predominantly in shot put. He was a bronze medalist at the 2023 European Athletics Indoor Championships where he became the Ukrainian national record holder.

Career
From Odesa, Kokoshko became the champion of Ukraine on August 22, 2019 with a personal best throw of 19.70m.

He began training in Portugal in 2021 under the guidance of the Ukrainian coach Volodymyr Zinchenko. The following summer he marked a new personal best throw of 21.23 metres at an event in Lisbon.

In 2022 Kokoshko took part in the World Athletics Championships in Eugene, Oregon and the European Athletics Championships in Munich, but did not qualify for the final in either event.

Kokoshko set a new national shot put record in winning the bronze medal at the 2023 European Athletics Indoor Championships in Istanbul, on March 3, 2023. He threw 21.84 to beat the mark set by Oleksandr Bagach in 1999. He achieved this with his last throw in the event.

References

External links

1996 births
Living people 
Ukrainian male shot putters
Sportspeople from Odesa Oblast